The Kawai K4 is a  61 key  synthesizer manufactured in 1989 by Kawai. It contains several features beyond those offered on Kawai's K1, adding resonant filters and a DAC PCM wavetable. The K4 incorporated a new type of synthesis called Digital Multi Spectrum.

Features
 2 line LCD screen
 256 16 bit, 32 kHz internal waveforms (96 Digital Cyclic waveforms and 160 PCM samples) 
 Drum section (61 drum patches)

Interestingly, the K4 uses a system that splits 16 bit samples between two read only memory (ROM) chips, while reserving a third chip for 8 bit sound samples that naturally have more noise (such as cymbals, snares, and other noisier percussion) in order to have more functionality for a cheaper manufacturing cost.

Kawai K4R
A 2U rack mounted module was also produced by Kawai. It has six separate audio outputs in addition to standard left/right stereo outs and a headphone socket. The effects are removed in the rack mounted version as it is presumed  outboard effects will be used with the unit.

References

Further reading

External links
 Kawai K4 Owner's Manual

Kawai synthesizers
Digital synthesizers
Polyphonic synthesizers